Dirk Heidenblut (born 21 April 1961) is a German politician of the Social Democratic Party (SPD) who has been serving as a member of the Bundestag from the state of North Rhine-Westphalia since 2013.

Political career 
Heidenblut became a member of the Bundestag in the 2013 German federal election, representing the Essen II district. He is a member of the Committee on Health. In this capacity, he serves as his parliamentary group's rapporteur on the digitization of healthcare in Germany.

References

External links 

  
 Bundestag biography 

1961 births
Living people
Members of the Bundestag for North Rhine-Westphalia
Members of the Bundestag 2021–2025
Members of the Bundestag 2017–2021
Members of the Bundestag 2013–2017
Members of the Bundestag for the Social Democratic Party of Germany